Basil Lythgoe, FRS (18 August 1913 — 18 April 2009) was a British organic chemist who investigated the structure of many natural substances including nucleosides, plant toxins, and vitamin D2. He was Professor of Organic Chemistry at the University of Leeds.

Early life and education
Lythgoe was born in Leigh, Lancashire and educated at Leigh Grammar School.  He then read chemistry at the University of Manchester from 1930, graduating BSc with first class honours.  He completed his PhD in 1936 under the supervision of Sir Ian Heilbron.  After a short period with ICI in Huddersfield, he joined Lord Todd's research team in Manchester and later at the University of Cambridge.

Academic career
Lythgoe initially became an Assistant Lecturer at Manchester, then a Lecturer at Cambridge and a fellow of King's College.  He was appointed Professor of Organic Chemistry at the University of Leeds in 1953, additionally acting as chairman of the School of Chemistry there between 1968 and 1971.  He retired from Leeds in 1978.

Honours
Lythgoe was elected Fellow of the Royal Society (FRS) in 1958. He also was appointed to the Tilden Lectureship of the Chemical Society in 1958, received the Synthetic Organic Chemistry Award of the Chemical Society and the Simonsen Lectureship of the Chemical Society in 1978 and the Chemical Society Award for Organic Synthesis in 1979.

Personal life
In 1946, Lythgoe married the mathematician Kate Hallam, whom he had met in Manchester.  They remained married for 57 years until her death in 2003 and had two sons, John and Andrew.

Death
Lythgoe died in 2009, aged 95.

References

British chemists
Organic chemists
Fellows of the Royal Society
Alumni of the University of Manchester
Alumni of the University of Cambridge
Academics of the University of Manchester
Academics of the University of Cambridge
Fellows of King's College, Cambridge
Academics of the University of Leeds
1913 births
2009 deaths
People from Leigh, Greater Manchester